Coco Chanel (1883–1971) was a French fashion designer.

Coco Chanel may also refer to:
Coco Chanel (film), 2008
"Coco Chanel", a song by Nicki Minaj from her 2018 album Queen

See also
"Coco" (24kGoldn song), 2020
DJ Cocoa Chanelle, American DJ